Kala Suri Visharadha Dr. Mudunkotuwa Munasinghe Arachchige Sujatha Perera  (born 12 May 1942: as සුජාතා අත්තනායක), colloquially known as Sujatha Aththanayaka , is a Sri Lankan songstress and playback singer. She is a prominent playback singer in Sinhala cinema and also in Sri Lankan and Indian Tamil cinema. Considered as the golden bell of Sinhala music, she holds the record for the most number of cassettes produced by a Sri Lankan songstress with more than 115 cassettes in a career spanning more than seven decades. She is the first female music director in Sri Lanka. She contributed for nearly 400 Sinhala films and 20 Sri Lankan-Indian Tamil Films as a playback singer. She sang more than 6000 Sinhala songs and more than 1000 songs in 9 different languages.

Personal life

She was born on 12 May 1942 in Kelaniya as the third of the family with five siblings. Her father Mudunkotuwa Munasinghe Arachchige Dharmadasa Perera was a police sergeant. Her mother Gertrude Margaret Wolboff aka Vimala Kantha was a tower hall actress and singer. She started education in 1947 from Wedamulla Maha Vidyalaya, Kelaniya. She has two sisters and two brothers. Her sister Ranjani Perera is a renowned dance teacher and younger brother Susil Perera is a popular comedian and a musician.

She is married to Navaratne Aththanayaka. She met Navaratne at the State College of Music. The couple has three sons - Hely Sajeewa, Chanaka, Samin. Her second son Captain Chanaka Sanjeewa died on September 25, 1992 in Pooneryn during Eelam War II. Since his death, Aththanayaka quit from singing and start to wear white sarees.

After his son's death, she left Sri Lanka for America in 1992. Due to the huge fan demand, she performed a series of successful concerts titled Jeevana Vila Meda in 2012.

Music career
In 1950, she song Malse Dileva for a feature program in SLBC. After school life at the age of 18, she studied at the State College of Aesthetic and then from State College of Music in 1960.  At first she was a lecturer at the Kalutara Teachers Training College and then became a Director of Education (Music) at Ministry of Education, Sri Lanka. In 1967 she went India to complete a master's degree and "Visharadha" Exams from Lucknow College of Music in singing and playing sitar. After returning, she started to work at Radio Ceylon becoming the only female singer to perform classical music programs on Sri Lanka Radio. He retired as the Director of Aesthetic Education. In 1958 she became the first Sinhalese singer who sang a Hindi song for the program “Bal Sakha”.

In 1975, she became the first Sri Lankan female music director and directed music for films such as Hariyata Hari and Sanda Kinduru. Apart from music direction, Aththanayake involved as a playback singer and radio drama singer for many years started with 1956 film Sohoyuro at the age of 14. She sung several popular playback film songs such as Jeewana Vila Meda, Maligawe Ma Rajini, Onchilla Thotili, Guwan Thotille, Herde Rasa Malige, Parawunu Mal Wala and Puthune Me Ahaganna. She recorded four playback songs for four films in one day, which is a record in Sri Lanka. The first song was recorded at Kandana S. P. M. studio. The second song was done in the afternoon at Hendala Vijaya Studios. The third song was recorded at the University of Kelaniya studio and the fourth song was recorded at Lanka Studios.
She sang playback songs for nearly 400 Sinhala Films.
In 1979, a special music test conducted by the Sri Lanka Broadcasting Corporation won the first place in the rankings, beating all other singers.

She is the only singer to perform in India where she sang from different languages such as Hindi, Tamil, Urdu, Telugu, Malayalam, Marati, English and Nepali. In 1980, she had the opportunity to sing the song Subha Kamina at the President's House when Nepal King Birendra and Queen Vimla arrived Sri Lanka. She was the first Sinhala singer to perform a Nepali song in the Asian Hindi Service. She also performed a Tamil one-man concert Swaram in Bambalapitiya as well as an Islam concert Ilampirai Geethangal in Maradana. She sung Tamil songs for 20 Tamil Films. She sang playback songs for Indian actresses like Radhika Sarathkumar, Thanuja Mukherjee & Vaijayanthimala.

Her husband was the musician  in some of her popular songs including Aganthuka Kurulla, Bolan Podi Nangi Tikak Hitapan, Jeewathwana Thuru Ma, Neth Wasa and Wessata Themi Themi. Apart from singing, she is a talented Katak dancer who studied under Sirimathi Rasadari. In 1985, she represented Sri Lankan cultural delegation for the SAARC Summit. In 1992, after the death of son, he launched a cassette "Yuda Bima Kandulak" to commemorate the his son's first death anniversary.

She sang more than 6000 Sinhala songs and 1000 Tamil songs. She also involved with many popular duets including; Obe Namin, Banda Jaya Keheli with Amaradeva Sandun Sihil, Adara Pujasane with Victor Rathnayake, Koho Koho Kohe Idan with Sanath Nandasiri, Bonda Meedum Kandurelle with Abeywardena Balasuriya, Chandrame Ra Paya Awa, Ghana Andakarayen Midi with H.R. Jothipala, Piruna Hada Santhane, Gangawe Neela Jale with Harun Lanthra, Madhura Yame with R. Muttusamy, Pera Athmayaka with Milton Perera and Pushpa Makarandaya with Narada Disasekara.

In 2016, she directed the music for the Sri Lanka Police theme song and later she composed the theme song of Sri Lanka Special Task Force (STF).

Concerts

In 1974 she started her first solo concert "Asi Mihira"

 Asi Mihira - First Solo Concert - From 1974
 Swaram - Solo Tamil Songs Concert
 Ilampirei Geethangal - Solo Islam Songs Concert
 Gee Pooja - This concert was performed for the people displaced by the war and for the soldiers during war period.
 Sujatha Gee - This Concert was performed in foreign countries like America, France, New Zealand etc.
 Sujatha Swara Sangeet - India Nagpur
 Jeevana Vila Meda (2012 - 2013)

Awards and accolades
In 1965, she was awarded the Swarna Sanka Award for Best Singer of the Year for the song Duka Eka Eka Peralila in the film Yata Giya Dawasa. In 1966, she won the award for the song Paravunu Mal Wala in the film Parasathumal at Sarasaviya Film Festival. She was awarded with “Pan Mai Kokilam” by Sri Lanka Muslim Artiste Front. In 2021, she was honored with lifetime achievement award during the ceremony held for 21 artists who made an invaluable contribution to Sinhala cinema in the early decades of Sinhala Cinema.

Sarasaviya Awards

|-
|| 1966 ||| Parawunu Mal Wala (Parasthu Mal) || Best Female Singer || 
|-
|| 1974 ||| Puthune Me Ahaganna (Kalyani Ganga) || Best Female Singer || 
|-
|| 1974 ||| Puthune Me Ahaganna (Kalyani Ganga) || Most Popular Singer || 
|-
|| 2016 ||| Contribution to Cinema || Ranathisara Award ||

Swarna Sankha Award

|-
|| 1965 ||| Duka Ena Kala (Yatagiya Dawasa) || Best Female Singer || 
|-
|| 1966 ||| Parawunu Mal Wala (Parasathu Mal) || Best Female Singer ||

Defence Awards

|-
|| 1994 ||| Sri Lanka Navy || Sudheera Matha Award || 
|-
|| 1994 ||| Sri Lanka Army || Abhimana Award || 
|-
|| 2012 ||| Sri Lanka Navy || Honorary Award || 
|-
|| 2013 ||| Sri Lanka Army || Gawrawa Prasada Sannasa || 
|-
|| 2014 |||  || Suwanda Padma Honorary Award || 
|-
|| 2014 |||  || Widulipura Honorary Award || 
|-
|| 2015 ||| Sri Lanka Police || Honorary Award || 
|-
|| 2019 ||| Sri Lanka Army || Weera Matha Award || 
|-
|| 1965 |||  || Best || 
|-
|| 1965 |||  || Best ||

Miscellaneous Awards

|-
|| 1972 ||| Best Female Singer || Kumarathungu Memorial Award || 
|-
|| 1972 ||| Most Popular Singer || Deepashika Award || 
|-
|| 1974 ||| Best Female Singer || Presidential Award || 
|-
|| 2012 |||  || Kalyani Prasadini Award || 
|-
|| 2013 |||  || Tower Hall Foundation Honorary Award || 
|-
|| 2014 ||| Sumathi Awards || U.W. Sumathipala Memorial Award || 
|-
|| 2014 ||| Dr.Lional Edirisinghe Memorial Award || University of the Visual and Performing Arts || 
|-
|| 2015 |||  || People's Honorary Award || 
|-
|| 2016 |||  || Youth Honorary Award || 
|-
|| 2012 |||  || Maliban Honorary Award || 
|-
|| 2014 |||  || Bank of Ceylon Honorary Award || 
|-
|| 2016 ||| State Music Awards || Sunil Shantha Memorial Award || 
|-
|| 2017 |||  || Sujatha Attanayake Abhinandana Award || 

2009 - Vidhyalankara Honorary Award

2011 - Dheemathi Award

2015- Susara Pranama Award

2017 - ADTF Honorary Award

2017 - Prathibha Pranama Award

2017 - OSCAR Pooja Pranama Award

2018 - Kalabhushana Award

2019 - Honorary Doctorate - University of the Visual and Performing Arts

2020 - Kalabhimani Award

2020 - Jeevana Prashansa Honorary Award

In 2017, Amila Lokumannage wrote her biopic ''Sujatha Deshaye Madurathama Swaraya" .

Attanayake's Book Launch ceremony entitled "Sujatha Attanayake Abhinandana" was held on November 11, 2017, at the Sri Lanka Foundation Institute where she launched her biography, "Sujatha Deshaye Madhurathama Swaraya" and a Catalogue of her songs titled "Sujatha Attanayake Geethawaliya", written by Amila Lokumannage.

In 2019, Aththanayake was honored as a heroic mother who was gifted a heroic son who sacrificed his life for the country. In the same year, she was awarded honorary doctorate from University of the Visual and Performing Arts.

Filmography

Playback singing

Playback film tracks

References

External links
 Sujatha Aththanayaka MP3 Songs
 සුජාතා අත්තනායක ගායනා කළ ගීත
 සිංහල සිනමාවේ රිදී සීනු
 සුජාතා අත්තනායක ජීවන පියසටහන්
 පළමු හා එකම දුර්ලභ කණ්‌ඩායම් ගීතය
 සුජාතා උමාරියාට දෙහි කපයි උමාරියා සමාව අයදී
 විසි වසරකට පසු මහින්දගේ ඉල්ලීම ඉටුකළ සුජාතා

Living people
20th-century Sri Lankan women singers
Sinhalese singers
1942 births
21st-century Sri Lankan women singers
Indian classical musicians